This is a list of Rechabite halls, that is, temperance halls associated with the Independent Order of Rechabites.

References 

Friendly societies
Temperance movement